Laurent "Riss" Sourisseau (born 20 September 1966) is a French cartoonist, author and publisher. Since 1992, he has worked for the French satirical weekly newspaper Charlie Hebdo and is now its majority owner.

Career
Sourisseau is the author of several books printed in France and his political cartoons appear often on the cover of Charlie Hebdo

Charlie Hebdo shooting

On 7 January 2015 Sourisseau was shot and wounded in the shoulder during the terrorist attack on the Charlie Hebdo office.  From the hospital, he drew four cartoons for the issue of Charlie Hebdo released on 14 January.

Riss is now the publishing director of the magazine, and he owns 70% of the shares.

Works
The Great Trial by Charlie Hebdo: The trial Papon collective scenario Editions Charlie Hebdo / Rotary 1998
Granny Woman Practice Noon Seeking 1999
The Tour de France of the Crime, Charlie Hebdo, Special Issue No. 11, Editions Rotary 2000
Face kärchée of Sarkozy, with Richard Malka and Philippe Cohen (screenplay), Issy-les-Moulineaux: Vents d'Ouest, Paris: Fayard, p 155, 2006 (.  )
Survey Nicolas Sarkozy before his accession to the presidency of the Republic during the 2007 presidential election; followed after his election, the Countenance of 
Face kärchée Sarkozy's more: Sarko 1 with Richard Malka and Philippe Cohen (screenplay), 37 p 2007 (.  )
Presidential 2007: Campaign blog of Charlie Hebdo, with Anne-Sophie Mercier, Editions Jean-Claude Gawsewitch 2007
I Do Not Like School, Hoëbeke 2007
The American Dream Explained to the Disbelievers, Albin Michel, 2007
Nothing to masturbate, Supplement No. 828 of Charlie Hebdo (30 April), 32 p., 2008
Carla and Carlito or Castle Life with Richard Malka and Philippe Cohen (screenplay), ed. 12a -Fayard, 64 pp., 2008
My First Crusade, Georgie Bush goes to War, published The Fumbles, 2008
Obama, what else? With Jean-Luc Hees, ed. The Fumbles, 2009
Hitler in my Living Room. Private Photos of Germany from 1933 to 1945, ed. The Fumbles, 2009

Participation in collective works

Collective, Mozart being murdered, Albin Michel, 2006, Charb, Catherine Meurisse, Luz, Tignous and Jul
Holiday Book of Charlie Hebdo, published The Fumble, 2009, Catherine Meurisse, Charb and Luz
Freedom - Equality - Fraternity cartoons collections
The brief of Charlie Hebdo, published The Fumbles 2008
Blame Society, collective, ed. 12a, 2008

References

French cartoonists
French editorial cartoonists
French satirists
Charlie Hebdo people
People from Melun
1966 births
Living people
French shooting survivors